Alyona Olehivna Savranenko (born 14 June 1991), better known by her stage name Alyona Alyona, is a Ukrainian rapper and songwriter. She released her debut album, Pushka («Пушка»), in 2019, followed by an extended play the same year, V khati MA («В хаті МА»).

Alyona is considered "the new rap star of Ukraine", and "the sensation of Ukrainian rap" by Ukrainian media. In an article titled "15 European Pop Acts Who Matter Right Now", The New York Times likened her to Azealia Banks.

Background 
Alyona Savranenko was born in the urban-type settlement of Kapitanivka, Novomyrhorod Raion, Kirovohrad Oblast. She holds two bachelor's degrees, one of which comes from the Gregory Skovoroda Pedagogical State University of Pereiaslav. Before doing rap, she worked as a teacher at "Teremok" kindergarten of Baryshivka, Kyiv Oblast. Alyona then headed the kindergarten of the neighboring village of Dernivka. In total, Alyona worked for four years in kindergartens, and left the job once she gained popularity.

Singing career 

Alyona started writing rap music in the middle of the 2000s, with multiple attempts to reach a wider audience. Her initial stage name was Alyona Al.kaida.

Under her current alias, alyona alyona released her first videoclip in October 2018, for the song called "Rybky" («Рибки»). On October 24, she released the second videoclip of the same track, this time with professional directing. On November 12, alyona alyona released the videoclip of "Holovy" («Голови»), which garnered one million views on YouTube in the first month. This was followed by two more videoclips: "Vidchynyai" («Відчиняй») on November 30, and "Zalyshayu sviy dim" («Залишаю свій дім») in December. The latter symbolically depicts the artist leaving Baryshivka, her home town.

In January 2019, in the middle of a political scandal involving President Poroshenko, alyona alyona released a new song, titled "Obitsyanki” («Обіцянки» – "Promises"). Later that year, on April 8, alyona alyona released her first album, Pushka («Пушка»), as well as the videoclip of the homonymous main track. The album features four previously released songs, as well as nine new ones, including "Padlo" («Падло»), in a duo with Alina Pash. Alyona was praised in the Vogue issue of that month as "Ukraine's most unlikely rap star".

alyona alyona performed at the Sziget Festival, Budapest, in August 2019. In December 2019, she wrote the lyrics of "Vilna" («Вільна»), a song performed by Tina Karol and Julia Sanina and included in the soundtrack of the Ukrainian feature film Viddana.

On February 7, 2020, alyona alyona signed with the Polish label Def Jam Polska.

On January 15, 2021 Alyona Alyona won the Public Choice Award at Music Moves Europe Talent Awards contest.

In 2021 Alyona Alyona was part of the Ukrainian jury for the Eurovision Song Contest.

Discography

Albums 
 2021: Galas  
 2019: Pushka («Пушка»)
 2019: V khati MA («В хаті МА»)

Singles 
 2018: "Holovy" («Голови»)
 2018: "Vidchynyai” («Відчиняй»)
 2018: "Zalyshayu sviy dim” («Залишаю свій дім»)

Collaborations 
 2019: "Hory" («Гори») with Kalush
 2020: "Zhali" («Жалі») with Jamala
 2020: "Dancer" with Vladimir Cauchemar
 2021: "Ultrabeat" with Space of Variations

Videoclips

Collaborations

Accolades

References

External links 

 

1991 births
21st-century Ukrainian women singers
Ukrainian rappers
Living people
People from Kirovohrad Oblast